Kårböle is a village in Ljusdal Municipality, Hälsingland, Gävleborg County, Sweden with about 134 inhabitants (2004, Statistics Sweden). The Kårböle stave church can be found here.

Populated places in Ljusdal Municipality
Hälsingland